Medveja  may refer to:

 Medveja, Moldova
 Medveja, Croatia